Berosini is a tribe of Hydrophilinae and contains 364 species in 5 genera.

Genera
After Short and Fikáček (2011).
 Allocotocerus
 Berosus
 Derallus
 Hemiosus
 Regimbartia

References

Polyphaga tribes
Hydrophilinae